Chris Stewart (born April 7, 1961) is a Canadian ice hockey coach and manager. He was most notable as the head coach and general manager of the Colorado Eagles while they were in the Central Hockey League and the ECHL.

Career 
As a head coach, Stewart has won three Ray Miron President's Cups. He won his first Central Hockey League championship with the 1998–99 Huntsville Channel Cats, and won two more with the Colorado Eagles (then of the CHL) in the 2004–05 and 2006–07 seasons. He initially retired as head coach of the Eagles in 2008 before returning to the position in 2010. He retired for a second time in 2016 but remained with the Eagles as general manager. The Eagles won back-to-back Kelly Cups in his last two seasons as general manager before the organization joined the American Hockey League in 2018. As the Eagles became the AHL affiliate of the Colorado Avalanche, he was replaced as general manager by the Avalanche's assistant general manager, Craig Billington, in 2018.

References

External links

1961 births
Living people
Canadian ice hockey coaches
Central Hockey League coaches
ECHL coaches
Ice hockey people from Alberta
Prince Albert Raiders coaches
St. Albert Saints players
Sportspeople from Red Deer, Alberta
Canadian ice hockey defencemen